Steve Kuzmicich (2 November 1931 - 14 June 2018) was a statistician from New Zealand and was Government Statistician of New Zealand from 1984 to 1992.

References

1931 births
2018 deaths
Government Statisticians of New Zealand
New Zealand mathematicians
New Zealand statisticians
20th-century New Zealand public servants